Joel Bergman (August 20, 1936 – August 24, 2016) was an American architect who has designed several landmark casinos.

Bergman was born in Los Angeles. He graduated from the University of Southern California in 1965.

Projects

Stern and Associates
In 1968 he joined Martin Stern, Jr.
Las Vegas Hilton (then called the Hotel International)'
Kings Castle Resort & Casino, Lake Tahoe, Nevada
The Cottages at The Kuilima Resort, Oahu, Hawaii
MGM Grand Hotel & Casino, Reno & Las Vegas, Nevada
Little America Hotel Tower, Salt Lake City, Utah

Atlandia Design (1978–1994)
In 1978 he went to work exclusively for Steve Wynn through the firm Atlandia Design. Wynn had a chair adjacent to his drafting table and together they played an important role in transforming the Las Vegas strip from a low rise strip to the modern theme-oriented casino with high rise buildings.
Golden Nugget Las Vegas - 1977 renovation; 1980 North Tower
Golden Nugget Atlantic City 1980 original design/in 2009 he is doing renovations for the Atlantic City Hilton (its current name)
Golden Nugget Laughlin - 1986 renovation
The Mirage 1989
Treasure Island Hotel and Casino 1993

Bergman Walls & Associates (1994–present)
In 1994 he and Scott Walls, who had also worked for Wynn, started their own firm.
Mystic Lake Casino, Prior Lake, Minnesota 1994
Caesars Palace (1997 tower)/tower/2004 Convention Hall, Multiple Restaurants, Suites & interior renovation.(1994 thru current)
Paris Las Vegas 1999
Sahara Hotel and Casino 1999 renovation/Speedworld addition
Barona Casino, Lakeside, California 2001
Resorts Atlantic City (27-story "Rendezvous Tower) opened in 2004
L'Auberge du Lac Resort, Lake Charles, Louisiana 2005
MGM Grand Las Vegas (3 38-story towers called the Signature at MGM Grand) built in 2005 and 2006
Trump Hotel Las Vegas 2008
Rivers Casino, Pittsburgh, Pennsylvania, primarily built in 2008 and 2009 (opened August 9, 2009)
Fontainebleau Resort Las Vegas (cancelled during construction)
Pure Night Club, Las Vegas Nevada (at Caesars Palace) 2005
River City Casino, St. Louis, Missouri 2007 
Golden Nugget Resort & Casino Riverboat, Lake Charles, Louisiana 2014
Snoqualmie Casino, Snoqualmie, Washington 2009
Gilley's Saloon, Dance Hall & BBQ at Treasure Island, Las Vegas, Nevada 2010
Gaudin Porsche Jaguar, Las Vegas, Nevada 2002

References

External links
bwaltd.com

1936 births
2016 deaths
20th-century American architects
USC School of Architecture alumni
21st-century American architects
Architects from Los Angeles